Anthedon may refer to:

Places
 Anthedon (Boeotia), an ancient town in Boeotia (continental Greece)
 Anthedon (Palestine), an ancient town and former bishopric near Gaza, now a Latin Catholic titular see

Zoology
Any of three species of butterfly:
 Enodia anthedon
 Graphium anthedon
 Hypolimnas anthedon

Other uses
 Anthedon (mythology), one of several mythical figures
 USS Anthedon (AS-24), a submarine tender of the US Navy